"Ugly Berry" is the sixth episode in the third season, the 47th episode overall, of the American dramedy series Ugly Betty, which aired on October 30, 2008. The episode was written by Bill Wrubel and directed by Ron Underwood.

Plot

Realizing that they have created a monster, both Marc and Amanda join forces with Betty to destroy Kimmie Keegan's career at MODE and sabotage a photo shoot with Adriana Lima. Meanwhile at the Suarezes, Ignacio prepares for his first chance to vote while Hilda capitalizes on the elections to boost business in her beauty salon only to be caught by a New York councilman. In the meantime, Daniel meets MODE's new Chief Financial Officer, Connor Owens

Ratings
The episode was watched by 8.6 million viewers in the United States, averaging a 5.6/9 rating overall and a 2.5/7 among 18-49s.

Also starring
Lindsay Lohan as Kimmie Keegan
David Blue as Cliff St. Paul
Val Emmich as Jesse
Alec Mapa as Suzuki St. Pierre

Guest starring
Adriana Lima as herself
Grant Bowler as Connor Owens

References

See also
 Ugly Betty
 Ugly Betty (season 3)

2008 American television episodes
Ugly Betty (season 3) episodes